The 1999 Acclaim Mosconi Cup, the sixth edition of the annual nine-ball pool competition between teams representing Europe and the United States, took place 16–19 December 1999 at the York Hall in Bethnal Green, London, England.

Team USA won the Mosconi Cup by defeating Team Europe 12–7.

Teams

Results

Thursday, 16 December

Session 1

Friday, 17 December

Session 2

Session 3

Saturday, 18 December

Session 4

Session 5

Sunday, 19 December

Session 6

Session 7

References

External links
 Official homepage

1999
1999 in cue sports
1999 sports events in London
Sport in the London Borough of Tower Hamlets
1999 in English sport
December 1999 sports events in the United Kingdom